This is a list of dates associated with the prehistoric peopling of the world (first known presence of Homo sapiens).

The list is divided into four categories, Middle Paleolithic (before 50,000 years ago),
Upper Paleolithic (50,000 to 12,500 years ago), Holocene (12,500 to 500 years ago) and Modern (Age of Sail and modern exploration).
List entries are identified by region (in the case of genetic evidence spatial resolution is limited) or region, country or island, with the date of the first known or hypothesised modern human presence (or "settlement", although Paleolithic humans were not sedentary).

Human "settlement" does not necessarily have to be continuous; settled areas in some cases become depopulated due to environmental conditions, such as glacial periods or the Toba volcanic eruption. Early Homo sapiens migrated out of Africa from as early as 270,000 years ago, although these early migrations may have died out and permanent Homo sapiens presence outside of Africa may not have been established until about 70-50,000 years ago.

Middle Paleolithic

Before Homo sapiens, Homo erectus had already spread throughout Africa and non-Arctic Eurasia by about one million years ago. The oldest known evidence for anatomically modern humans are fossils found at Jebel Irhoud, Morocco, dated about 360,000 years old.

Upper Paleolithic

Holocene

Modern

See also
 Early human migrations
 Pre-modern human migration
 Human evolution
 List of human evolution fossils
 Timeline of human evolution
 Timeline of prehistory
 Timeline of space exploration

References

External links
 Atlas of the Human Journey – National Geographic
 Journey of Mankind – Genetic Map – Bradshaw Foundation

!
Evolution-related lists
Human settlement

First human settlement
Human settlements
Settlements